Abacetus polli is a species of ground beetle in the subfamily Pterostichinae. It was described by Straneo in 1949.

References

polli
Beetles described in 1949